Personal Demons may refer to:

Novels

 Personal Demon, a 2008 fantasy novel by Kelley Armstrong
 Personal Demons (Desrochers novel), a 2010 YA fantasy novel by Lisa Desrochers

Television

 "Personal Demons" (The Twilight Zone), a 1986 segment of episode 18 of The Twilight Zone